Doina Petruţa Băicoianu Cojocaru (November 25, 1948 in Sighişoara – December 14, 1996) was a Romanian handball player who competed in the 1976 Summer Olympics.

She was part of the Romanian handball team, which finished fourth in the Olympic tournament. She played all five matches and scored one goal.

References

1948 births
1996 deaths
Romanian female handball players 
Olympic handball players of Romania

Handball players at the 1976 Summer Olympics